Full Moon in St. Petersburg is a live music album by German heavy metal band Rage, recorded in SKK, St. Petersburg, Russia on 25 May 2006. The album was also released on DVD, separately from DVD only in Russia and Argentina. On other countries released only as part of CD+DVD combo.

Track listing

Personnel

Band members 
Peter "Peavy" Wagner – vocals, bass
Victor Smolski – guitars
Mike Terrana – drums

Production 
Charly Czajkowski – producer, engineering, mixing
Rage – producer

DVD 

Full Moon in St. Petersburg is a live concert video album by German heavy metal band Rage, released on DVD in February 2007. The DVD contains the show that the band played in SKK, St. Petersburg, Russia on 25 May 2006.

DVD 1 track listing

DVD 2 content 
Documentary: Making of St. Petersburg
Documentary: Russia Tour 2006, Moscow
Documentary: Russia Tour 2006, Kiev, Ukraine
Documentary: Europe Tour 2006
Private Documentary: Victor
Flying Notes
Tricky Strings
Motorsports Documentary
Private Documentary: Peavy
Ice Age Collection Documentary
Skull Cast Documentary
Private Documentary: Mike
The Rhythm Beast

Personnel

Band members 
Peter "Peavy" Wagner – vocals, bass
Victor Smolski – guitars
Mike Terrana – drums

Production 
Charly Czajkowski – producer, engineering, mixing
Rage – producer

Rage (German band) albums
Nuclear Blast video albums
Nuclear Blast live albums
2007 live albums
2007 video albums
Thrash metal video albums
Power metal video albums
Speed metal video albums